Xocalı (also, Khodzhaly, Khadzhaly, and Khodzhallar) is a village and municipality in the Salyan Rayon of Azerbaijan.  It has a population of 365.

References 

Populated places in Salyan District (Azerbaijan)